Rolf Åkerström (born 22 May 1960) is a Swedish bobsledder. He competed in the two man event at the 1988 Winter Olympics.

References

1960 births
Living people
Swedish male bobsledders
Olympic bobsledders of Sweden
Bobsledders at the 1988 Winter Olympics
Sportspeople from Stockholm